Richard A. Long (February 9, 1927 – January 3, 2013) was an American cultural historian and author, who has been called "one of the great pillars of African-American arts and culture". As an academic, he taught at University of Pennsylvania, University of Paris, University of Poitiers, Atlanta University, Emory University, Morgan State College and West Virginia State College, and had worked as a visiting lecturer at universities in Africa and India.

Early life and education
Richard Alexander Long was the fourth of six children born to Thaddeus B. Long and Leila Washington in Philadelphia, Pennsylvania. He graduated from Temple University, where he received his B.A. in 1947 and M.A. in 1948. He did doctoral studies at the University of Pennsylvania, was a Fulbright Scholar at the University of Paris, and received his Ph.D from the University of Poitiers in France in 1965.

Career 
Having begun his teaching career as a graduate assistant at Temple University, Long subsequently taught at West Virginia State College. He also spent a decade and a half as a teacher at Morgan State College (now University). He taught English and French at the Hampton Institute and was also director of its College Museum. At Hampton in 1968 he founded the Triennial Symposium on African Art, now an annual conference at Atlanta University's Center for African and African American Studies.

In 1968 he became a Professor of English at Atlanta University (now Clark Atlanta University), where he was founder of the African American Studies program. From 1971 to 1973 he was visiting lecturer at Harvard University. In 1973 he went as adjunct professor to Emory University, where in 1987 he joined the faculty as Atticus Haygood Professor of Interdisciplinary Studies in the Graduate Institute of the Liberal Arts.

Long served as a consultant and as a committee member of many cultural organizations and institutions, including the Second World Black and African Festival of Arts and Culture, both the National Endowment for the Arts and the National Endowment for the Humanities, the Smithsonian Museum of African Art, the High Museum of Art in Atlanta, the Society of Dance History Scholars, and the Zora Neale Hurston Festival. In addition, Long served on the editorial boards of several publications, including the Langston Hughes Bulletin, Phylon and the Zora Neale Hurston Bulletin.

Long died at home on January 3, 2013, at the age of 85.

Writings
Long began his literary career in 1985 with Black Americana, and later published books such as The Black Tradition in American Dance (1989), African Americans: A Portrait (1993), Grown Deep: Essays on the Harlem Renaissance (1998) and One More Time: Harlem Renaissance History and Historicism (2007). He was co-author with Marcia Ann Gillespie and Rosa Johnson Butler of Maya Angelou: A Glorious Celebration (2008).

His papers are deposited at the Atlanta Fulton Public Library's Auburn Avenue Research Library.

Selected bibliography 

 Black Americana, 1985
 The Black Tradition in American Dance, Rizzoli, 1989
 African Americans: A Portrait, 1993
 Grown Deep: Essays on the Harlem Renaissance, 1998
 One More Time: Harlem Renaissance History and Historicism, 2007
 With Marcia Ann Gillespie and Rosa Johnson Butler, Maya Angelou: A Glorious Celebration, 2008

References

External links

Stuart A. Rose Manuscript, Archives, and Rare Book Library, Emory University: Richard A. Long posters, 1933–2011
 Britton Rogers, "Celebrating Black History Month: Dr. Richard A. Long and the Glenn House", The Glenn House Restoration, February 28, 2018.

1927 births
2013 deaths
20th-century African-American people
21st-century African-American people
Academic staff of the University of Paris
Academic staff of the University of Poitiers
African-American historians
American academics of English literature
Clark Atlanta University faculty
Emory University faculty
Hampton University faculty
Historians from Pennsylvania
Morgan State University faculty
Temple University alumni
University of Pennsylvania faculty
West Virginia State University faculty
Writers from Philadelphia